Breweries in Mississippi produce a wide range of beers in different styles that are marketed locally, regionally, and nationally. Brewing companies vary widely in the volume and variety of beer produced,  from small nanobreweries and microbreweries to massive multinational conglomerate macrobreweries.

In 2012 Mississippi's three brewing establishments (including breweries, brewpubs, importers, and company-owned packagers and wholesalers) employed 30 people directly, and more than 6,800 others in related jobs such as wholesaling and retailing. Altogether, three people in Mississippi had active brewer permits in 2012.

Including people directly employed in brewing, as well as those who supply Mississippi's breweries with everything from ingredients to machinery, the total business and personal tax revenue generated by Mississippi's breweries and related industries was more than $128 million. Consumer purchases of Mississippi's brewery products generated more than $101 million extra in tax revenue. In 2012, according to the Brewers Association, Mississippi ranked 51st (including the District of Columbia) in the number of craft breweries per capita, with three .

For context, at the end of 2013 there were 2,822 breweries in the United States, including 2,768 craft breweries subdivided into 1,237 brewpubs, 1,412 microbreweries and 119 regional craft breweries.  In that same year, according to the Beer Institute, the brewing industry employed around 43,000 Americans in brewing and distribution and had a combined economic impact of more than $246 billion.

Breweries

1817 Brewery - Okolona
Biloxi Brewing Company - Biloxi [Closed in 2019]
 Chandeleur Island Brewing Company - Gulfport
 Colludium Brewing Company - Hattiesburg
 Crooked Letter Brewery - Ocean Springs [Closed in 2019]
 Key City Brewing Company / Cottonwood Public House - Vicksburg
 Lazy Magnolia Brewing Company – Kiln
 Lucky Town Brewing Company – Jackson [Closed as of 3/9/2019]
 Mayhew Junction Brewing Company - Starkville
 Mississippi Brewing Company - Gulfport [Closed]
 Natchez Brewing Company - Natchez
 Slowboat Brewing Company - Laurel [Closed in 2019]
 Southern Prohibition Brewing Company – Hattiesburg
 Threefoot Brewing Company - Meridian 
 Yalobusha Brewing Company – Water Valley
 Gordon Creek Brewery – Hattiesburg [Closed]
 Oxford Brewing Company – Oxford  [Closed]
 SweetGum Brewing Company – Starkville [Closed]

See also 
 Beer in the United States
 List of breweries in the United States
 List of microbreweries

References

Further reading
 

Mississippi
Breweries